Morales is a town and municipality located in the Bolívar Department, Northern Colombia.

References
 Morales official website

Municipalities of Bolívar Department